Francisco de Solís (c.1620/1625, Madrid - 25 September 1684, Madrid), was a Spanish painter in the Baroque style. He also collected drawings and compiled biographies of other Spanish painters.

Life and work 
He was the son of the well known painter and scenographer, who wanted him to pursue an ecclesiastical career. He did, however, continue to practice painting in his father's workshop when he could spare the time. At the age of eighteen, he painted a scene depicting the Capuchins of Villarrubia de los Ojos, which was shown publicly before being taken to them. This attracted the attention of King Philip IV, who wanted to know more about the artist. This convinced him to make art his primary profession.

He was married to Lucía Barragán, also from a family of the minor nobility, and associated with intellectuals such as Pedro Calderón de la Barca. He was without financial worries, which made him unambitious as an artist, but he amassed a large library and a valuable collection of prints and drawings; some of which were signed as gifts to him. For many years, he operated a drawing school, but his only student who became known was the painter, .

He painted at many of the convents in Madrid, which provided for connections that brought commissions from outside the area; including the Franciscans in Viana and the Dominicans in Villanueva de los Infantes. In 1675, he painted the Annunciation for the convent of the Discalced Carmelites in Boadilla del Monte, where his daughter, Petronila, took her vows. He also did paintings for the chapel of the Convento de Copacabana. 

References

Further reading 
 Ismael Gutiérrez Pastor, "Novedades de pintura madrileña del siglo XVII: obras de José Antolínez y de Francisco Solís", in: Anuario del Departamento de Historia y Teoría del Arte (UAM),  vol. XII (2000), pgs. 75-92.
 Fernando Collar de Cáceres, "Una serie de la Pasión de Cristo firmada por Francisco de Solís", in: Anuario del Departamento de Historia y Teoría del Arte (UAM) , vol. III, 1991, pgs.93-100.
 Antonio Palomino, El museo pictórico y escala óptica III. El parnaso español pintoresco laureado, Aguilar S.A. de Ediciones (1988)

External links 

 Francisco de Solís @ the Museo del Prado

1620s births
1684 deaths
Spanish painters
Religious artists
17th-century Spanish painters
Artists from Madrid